Andernach station is the transportation hub of the city of Andernach in the German state of Rhineland-Palatinate. It is a mid-sized station with thousands of passengers each day. It is currently classified by Deutsche Bahn as a category 3 station. It has four passenger platforms (tracks 1, 2, 3 and 24), three with a length of more than 280 m, and sidings and freight tracks. It is on the Left Rhine line and is the terminus of the Cross Eifel Railway (Eifelquerbahn). In addition to passenger operations, the station has container and freight operations to the east of the station, particularly serving the tin plate manufacturer, Rasselstein.

In the station forecourt, there is a bus station, served by all city buses and regional bus services to Mayen, Neuwied and Ochtendung. The regional bus service to Maria Laach stops 50 metres from the bus station.

The station is currently being modernised. It is planned to increase the height of the central platform for its entire length to 76 centimetres, modernise the platform roof, provide barrier-free access using lifts, improve the environment, including the bus station, implement bike-and-ride and park-and-ride facilities, and provide new access to the main platform.

History 
Andernach received a rail extension of the Rhenish Railway Company’s Left Rhine line from Oberwinter to Weißenthurm on 15 August 1858. On 11 November 1858 the first train ran on the Left Rhine line to Koblenz. A year later, the line was extended to Bingerbrück.

The Eifelquer line from Andernach to Niedermendig was opened for freight on 1 April 1878 and for passengers on 15 May. This line was also owned by the Rhenish Railway Company. On 20 September 1879, the 2.33 km long freight line to Rheinwerft was opened.

All regional and some express trains stopped in Andernach, while most higher-quality passenger trains went by without stopping.

During the Second World War, Andernach station was completely destroyed. It was rebuilt after the war.

Services 

The only facility available at the station is a Deutsche Bahn (DB) ticket office, which has two counters. The restaurant, the bookshop, a former DB service point and a taxi call point are disused. The concourse has a departure monitor and touch-screen ticket machines of DB and trans-regio. There is also an ATM and seating.

Passenger operations 
Trains stop on four platforms at Andernach station. Long-distance services stopping at the station consist of Intercity-Express, Intercity and EuroCity trains. Regional services consist of Regional-Express (RE) and Regionalbahn (RB) trains to cities within 200 kilometres, running towards Cologne/Emmerich, Koblenz, Mainz and Mayen/Kaisersesch.

Regional services

Long distance

(as of December 2022)

Other stations in Andernach 
The town of Andernach has other stations in two suburbs:
Namedy on the Left Rhine line and served by MRB (Mittelrheinbahn) 26 trains
 Miesenheim on the Eifelquer Railway and served by RB 92 trains.

Notes

Railway stations in Rhineland-Palatinate
Railway stations in Germany opened in 1858
Buildings and structures in Mayen-Koblenz
1858 establishments in Prussia